Lagariça is a settlement in the western part of the island of Fogo, Cape Verde. It is situated 6 km northeast of the island capital São Filipe. One of its localities is named Coxo.

See also
List of villages and settlements in Cape Verde

References

Villages and settlements in Fogo, Cape Verde
São Filipe, Cape Verde